Robert Child may refer to:
 Robert Child (agriculturalist) (1613–1654), English physician, agriculturist and alchemist
 Sir Robert Child (Devizes MP) (1674–1721), English banker, Chairman of the East India Company 1715, Member of Parliament (MP) for Devizes 1713–15
 Robert Child (Wells MP) (1739–1782), English banker and politician, MP for Wells 1765–82

See also
Robert Childers (disambiguation)